The 2019 Telford and Wrekin Council election took place on 2 May 2019 to elect members of the Telford and Wrekin Council in England. It was held on the same day as other local elections.

Summary

Election result

|-

Ward results

Adamston & Bratton

Apley Castle

Arleston

Brookside

Church Aston & Lilleshall

College

Dawley & Aqueduct

Donnington

Dothill

Edgmond & Ercall Magna

Ercall

Hadley & Leegomery

Haygate

Horsehay & Lightmoor

Ironbridge Gorge

Ketley & Overdale

Madeley & Sutton Hill

Malinslee & Dawley Bank

Muxton

Newport North & West

Newport South & East

Oakengates & Katley Bank

Park

Priorslee

Shawbirch

St. George's

The Nedge

Woodside

Wrockwardine

Wrockwardine Wood & Trench

By-elections

Dawley & Aqueduct

Brookside

References

2019 English local elections
May 2019 events in the United Kingdom
2019
21st century in Shropshire